Albertslund Municipality is a municipality in Region Hovedstaden on the island of Zealand in eastern Denmark. The municipality covers an area of 23,04 km2, and has a population of 27,599 (1. January 2022).  Its mayor is Steen Christiansen, a member of the Social Democrats (Socialdemokraterne) political party. As of 2010 the social democrats have 9 of the 21 seats in the city council.

The main town and the site of its municipal council is the town of Albertslund.
The original name of the municipality was Herstedernes Kommune. In 1973 the name was changed to Albertslund Kommune. The name Herstederne represents the two communities of Herstedvester and Herstedøster which were the original villages in the area together with Vridsløse and Risby.

Neighboring municipalities are Glostrup to the east, Ballerup and Egedal municipality to the north, Høje-Taastrup to the west, and Vallensbæk and Brøndby to the south.

Albertslund is home to Danmarks International Kollegium, which has won many awards for its design.

Albertslund is also known for its effort in raising awareness about climate change.

Albertslund Municipality was not merged with other municipalities by 1 January 2007 as the result of nationwide 2007 Municipal Reform.

In 1973 Friluftsbadet Badesøen opened for the first time in Albertslund.

Economy
Companies headquartered in the municipality include FDB (Coop Danmark) and Kemp & Lauritzen.

Politics

Municipal council
Albertslund's municipal council consists of 21 members, elected every four years.

Below are the municipal councils elected since the Municipal Reform of 2007.

Twin towns – sister cities

Albertslund is twinned with:

 Borken, Germany
 Dainville, France
 East Renfrewshire, Scotland, United Kingdom
 Grabow, Germany
 Mölndal, Sweden
 Říčany, Czech Republic
 Whitstable, England, United Kingdom

Friluftsbadet Badesøen
Friluftsbadet Badesøen (Open-Air Swimming Lake) is a swimming pool in Albertslund Municipality.

Badesøen's distinctive, round pool is 60 m in diameter. It has a water surface of 2800 m2 and contains 3.6 million gallons of water. Water depth varies from 25 cm along the edge to 380 cm during the 1 and 3 meter lashes. In the children's departments is the water depth from 25 to 80 cm deep. The basin is divided into areas for small children, for children who cannot swim, and for swimmers. There is in the large area are two bathing bridges, between which there are a number of 50-meter lanes. Badesøen's two waterslides are respectively 60 and 43 meters long. The water temperature at approximately 22 degrees is powered by solar energy.

The whole area is 5000 m2 and includes a beach volleyball court, beach, ball field, streetbasket field, children's area, café area, boccia court, locker facilities and large grassed areas. On a warm summer days Badesøen visited 3,000 customers. Badesøen first opened in 1973.

See also 
 Herstedvester Church
 Herstedøster Church

References 

 Municipal statistics: NetBorger Kommunefakta, delivered from KMD aka Kommunedata (Municipal Data)
 Municipal mergers and neighbors: Eniro new municipalities map
Mapsearch of new municipalities(Krak)
 Printable map(Krak)(outline not printable!)
 List of twin towns: Albertslund.dk

External links 

 

 
Municipalities in the Capital Region of Denmark
Municipalities of Denmark
Copenhagen metropolitan area